Liz Sandals (née MacNaughton; born ) is a politician in Ontario, Canada.  She was a Liberal member of the Legislative Assembly of Ontario from 2003 to 2018 who represented the ridings of Guelph—Wellington and Guelph. She served in cabinet as the President of the Treasury Board until January 17, 2018 and previously served for three years as Minister of Education in the government of Kathleen Wynne.

Background
Sandals was born and raised in the Guelph, Ontario area as Liz MacNaughton. Her father, Earl MacNaughton was the founding dean of the College of Physics at the University of Guelph. She graduated from Guelph Collegiate Vocational Institute in 1966, and received a Bachelor of Science degree from the University of Guelph in 1969 as well as a Master of Mathematics degree from the University of Waterloo in 1971. She taught computer science at the University of Guelph. Sandals lives in Guelph with her husband David where they raised two children.

Politics

School board
Sandals was elected to her local public school board in 1988, and was re-elected four times. From 1998 to 2002, she served as President of the Ontario Public School Boards Association. Sandals was the recipient of the first Outstanding Contribution to Education Award, granted by the Ontario Principals' Council.

Provincial politics
In 2003, she ran for the Ontario Liberal Party nomination in the riding of Guelph, and defeated two long-time Liberals.  While she was a past supporter of the Progressive Conservative Party and worked for the 1995 campaign of rival Tory MPP Brenda Elliott, Sandals defeated Elliott in the Ontario provincial election of 2003 by 2,872 votes in the riding of Guelph—Wellington. During the 2003-2007 session she served as parliamentary assistant for several portfolios including Education. After being re-elected in 2007 in the redistributed riding of Guelph, she was again appointed as parliamentary assistant to portfolios including education and transportation. She was re-elected again in the 2011 election. On February 11, 2013, Sandals was appointed as the Minister of Education by Premier Kathleen Wynne. She was re-elected in 2014. On June 13, 2016, she was appointed as President of the Treasury Board.

As Minister of Education, Sandals oversaw the transition to a new collective bargaining system in the education system in Ontario. This new 2-tier collective bargaining structure resulted in new teacher contracts being signed with all of the major teachers' unions in 2015. Sandals also oversaw changes to the sex education curriculum, the first update to the curriculum since the late 1990s.

On October 6, 2017, she announced that she would not seek re-election in 2018.

Cabinet positions

Electoral record

See also
 List of University of Waterloo people

References

External links

1947 births
21st-century Canadian politicians
21st-century Canadian women politicians
Living people
Ontario Liberal Party MPPs
Members of the Executive Council of Ontario
People from Guelph
University of Waterloo alumni
Academic staff of the University of Guelph
University of Guelph alumni
Women government ministers of Canada
Women MPPs in Ontario